The Writers Guild of America Award for Television: Comedy/Variety Talk Series is an award presented by the Writers Guild of America to the best writing in a comedy or variety talk program. With the exception of 1998 in which no award was given, it has been presented annually since the 49th Writers Guild of America Awards in 1997 where Late Night with Conan O'Brien won the first award. From the award's creation, the category was dominated by Late Night with Conan O'Brien, winning six of the first nine awards. Recently, Last Week Tonight with John Oliver has won the award the last four years in a row, and five times in the last six years.

Winners and nominees

Notes
 The years denote when that particular season first aired; the awards are presented the following year. Though, due to the eligibility period, some nominees could have aired in a different year. Until 2001, the eligibility period adhered to a calendar schedule (January 1 to December 31). In 2001, the guild shifted to an earlier window (September 1, 2001 to November 30, 2002) to allow programs that premiered in the fall. From 2003 to 2018, the eligibility period was December 1 to November 30. Starting in 2018, the eligibility period shifted back to its original policy, corresponding with the calendar year (January 1 to December 31). The winners are highlighted in gold.

1990s

2000s

2010s

2020s

Submission guidelines
According to the Writers Guild of America's official rules for the Comedy/Variety Talk Series category, the names included in the nominations are those of every writer who participated in at least 25% of all episodes telecast during the eligibility period for a particular program. Nominees are chosen based on a submission of five sketches and/or monologues that best represent a series' overall quality of writing. Until 2015, the award was called the "Comedy/Variety (Including Talk) Series Award," including both talk shows and sketch comedies. Starting with the 68th Writers Guild of America Awards, the category was split into two separate awards: the "Comedy/Variety Talk Series Award" for programs that are primarily composed of monologue jokes, desk segments, and guest interviews, and the "Comedy/Variety Sketch Series Award" for programs that primarily consist of scripted sketches. The rule change allows for series like Saturday Night Live and Portlandia to compete against shows similar to their structure rather than late-night talk shows that are presented in a  different format.

Total awards
 NBC – 9
 HBO – 8
 Comedy Central – 5
 IFC – 1
 Showtime – 1

Programs with multiple awards
6 awards
 Late Night with Conan O'Brien (NBC)

5 awards
 Last Week Tonight with John Oliver (HBO)

4 awards
 The Colbert Report (Comedy Central)

3 awards
 Saturday Night Live (NBC)

2 awards
 Dennis Miller Live (HBO)

Programs with multiple nominations

12 nominations
 Late Night with Conan O'Brien (NBC)
 Real Time with Bill Maher (HBO)
 Saturday Night Live (NBC)

10 nominations
 The Daily Show with Jon Stewart (Comedy Central)

8 nominations
 The Colbert Report (Comedy Central)

6 nominations
 Conan (TBS)
 Last Week Tonight with John Oliver (HBO)
 Penn & Teller: Bullshit! (Showtime)

5 nominations
 Dennis Miller Live (HBO)
 Jimmy Kimmel Live! (ABC)
 Late Night with Seth Meyers (NBC)
 The Late Show with David Letterman (CBS)

4 nominations
 Full Frontal with Samantha Bee (Comedy Central)
 The Late Show with Stephen Colbert (CBS)

3 nominations
 MADtv (Fox)

2 nominations
 The Daily Show with Trevor Noah (Comedy Central)
 Politically Incorrect (ABC)
 Portlandia (IFC)
 The Problem with Jon Stewart (Apple TV+)

References

Writers Guild of America Awards
Late night television programming
Variety shows